The Swedish Defence University (FHS) is situated on Drottning Kristinas väg 37 in Östermalm, Stockholm City Centre, next to the campus of the Royal Institute of Technology.

History
Today's Swedish Defence University marks the latest development in a long line of military education tradition. The Higher Artillery College in Marieberg was established in Stockholm in the 19th century. The Swedish Defence University has existed in its present form since 1997. The University was established as a national university college on January 1, 2008, allowing it to issue academic degrees. Formerly known in English as the Swedish National Defence College, the University adopted its current name on 1 February 2015. In 2018 the Swedish Defence University received permission to grant two-year master's degrees.

Programme
The University trains and educates domestic and international military and civilian personnel. The University offers training for career and reserve officers of the Swedish Armed Forces. Graduates contribute, both nationally and internationally, to the management of crisis situations and security issues. Successful candidates are awarded a bachelor's degree in Military Science. The course is conducted over 6 semesters. On successful completion of all modules 180 credits are awarded.

The officers' programme is a three-year undergraduate degree course through which the officers gain proficiency as platoon-level leaders. Teachers and professors from the Swedish Defence University are often seen in the media as expert commentators on matters of public interest.

Research
The University is a founding member of the International Society of Military Sciences (ISMS) and hosted the ISMS annual conference in 2010. The University contributes towards national and international security through research and development. Research is carried out Military Arts and Sciences and subsequently disseminated both nationally and internationally. The University is a member of the International Association for Military Pedagogy, whose members include military and civilian professionals from military institutions of advanced learning.

Publications
At the Swedish Defense College, basic research and applied research are conducted with relevance to the area of community protection and security. The research covers both military and civilian aspects of the area and ranges from security policy and civilian crisis management to war, defense and military operations. Much of the published material can be found in DiVA, the Digital Scientific Archive, which is a publication database for research publications and student papers.

The Militärhistorisk tidskrift is the only one of its kind in the Nordic countries and is published by the Military History Section at the Swedish Defense College. Together with its predecessor Aktuellt och historiskt, it has been published since 1953. The Militärhistorisk tidskrift is usually published in December every year.

Facilities and buildings

From 1926, the Royal Swedish Army Staff College, the Royal Swedish Naval Staff College and the Artillery and Engineering College were located on Östermalmsgatan 87 in Stockholm in the so-called Grå huset ("Gray House"). In connection with the formation of the Swedish Armed Forces Staff College on 1 October 1961, the new school was moved to the barracks area on Valhallavägen 117, which had been built in 1877 for the Svea Artillery Regiment (A 1). With the addition of the Swedish Armed Forces Management College (Försvarets förvaltningshögskola, FörvHS) in 1994, two new places of education were also added, where the Swedish Armed Forces Management College had its education in Karlstad and Östersund. After the Swedish Armed Forces Staff College was disbanded on 31 December 1996, the premises on Valhallavägen 117 were taken over by the new Swedish National Defence College.

After initially remaining with most of the activities on the premises at Valhallavägen, it was decided in the early 2000s that the Swedish National Defense College would move to newly erected premises on Campus Valhallavägen at Drottning Kristinas väg, neighbor of the KTH Royal Institute of Technology. From 1 August 2005, the college operated on Drottning Kristinas väg 37. The new premises were inaugurated on 22 September 2005 by His Majesty the King Carl XVI Gustaf. In 2007, the Swedish National Defense College left Östersund and since 2007 it is located on Drottning Kristinas väg 37 in Stockholm, at Karlberg Palace, Byggnad Nydal in Solna and in Karolinen on Våxnäsgatan 10 in Karlstad.

Heraldry and traditions

Coat of arms
The coat of arms of the Swedish National Defence College from 1956 to 1985, and from 1994. Blazon: "Azure an erect sword surmounting an open chaplet of oak, or."

Traditions
The Swedish Defense College trace its lineage back to 1818 when the Higher Artillery School (Högre artilleriläroverket) in Marieberg was formed. Because the former Swedish Armed Forces Staff College was formed in 1961 by the service staff colleges, the Swedish Defense College thus has an unbroken lineage from the Higher Artillery School, the Royal Swedish Army Staff College, the Royal Swedish Naval Staff College, the Royal Swedish Air Force Staff College, the Swedish National Defence College, the Swedish Armed Forces Management College (Försvarets förvaltningshögskola, FörvHS), and the Swedish Armed Forces Staff College, and considers it their mission to look after this heritage. The original Marieberg clock, which stood in the yard at the Higher Artillery School in Marieberg in the 19th century, can today be found on the premises of the Swedish National Defense College on Drottning Kristinas väg.

Heads

Vice-Chancellors

1952–1953: Major General Richard Åkerman
1953–1955: Major General Thord Bonde
1955–1956: Major General Ivar Backlund
1957–1960: Major General Gustaf Adolf Westring
1960–1964: Major General Sam Myhrman
1964–1966: Rear Admiral Oscar Krokstedt
1966–1968: Major General Malcolm Murray
1968–1972: Major General Claës Skoglund
1972–1978: Lieutenant General Bo Westin
1978–1984: Major General Bengt Liljestrand
1984–1987: Major General Gustaf Welin
1986–1987: Major General Kjell Nordström (acting)
1987–1988: Vice Admiral Bror Stefenson
1988–1994: Major General Krister Larsson
1994–1996: Nils Gyldén
1997–1998: Rear Admiral Claes Tornberg
1998–2002: Major General Karlis Neretnieks
2002–2008: Henrik Landerholm
2008–2010: Mats Ericson
2011–2019: Romulo Enmark
2019–present: Robert Egnell

Deputy Vice-Chancellors
2005–2006: Brigadier General Tomas Fjellner
2006–2008: Colonel Lars Bergström
2009–2016: Brigadier General Bengt Axelsson
2017–2020: Rear admiral (lower half) Ewa Skoog Haslum
2020–2022: Brigadier General Fredrik Ståhlberg
2022–present: Brigadier General Anders Persson

See also

 Military Academy Karlberg
 List of universities in Sweden

References

Further reading

External links

International Society of Military Sciences

University colleges in Sweden
Higher education in Stockholm
Buildings and structures in Stockholm
Education in Östersund
Military education and training in Sweden
Military research of Sweden
Stockholm Garrison